The 1998 Syracuse Orangemen football team competed in football on behalf of Syracuse University during the 1998 NCAA Division I-A football season. The Orangemen were coached by Paul Pasqualoni and played their home games at the Carrier Dome in Syracuse, New York.

Schedule

Source:

Syracuse University collected the largest share of the $141.2-million pot that was split among bowl games participating universities. Syracuse received nearly $4.7-million, through its affiliation with the Big East Conference.

Rankings

Roster

Season summary

at Michigan

References

Syracuse
Syracuse Orange football seasons
Syracuse Orangemen football